Do Saran (also Romanized as Do Sarān, Dowsarān, and Dusaran) is a village in Qareh Poshtelu-e Bala Rural District, Qareh Poshtelu District, Zanjan County, Zanjan Province, Iran. At the 2006 census, its population was 146, in 35 families.

References 

Populated places in Zanjan County